Baritius eleuthera is a moth of the family Erebidae first described by Caspar Stoll in 1781. It is found in Suriname, Ecuador, Peru, Bolivia, Panama and the Brazilian state of Amazonas.

References

Phaegopterina
Moths described in 1781